Natrah binti Ismail is a Malaysian politician who served as the Member of Parliament (MP) for Sekijang fron May 2018 to November 2022. She is a member of the from the People's Justice Party (PKR), a component party of the Pakatan Harapan (PH) coalition.

Election results

References

External links

Living people
Malaysian people of Malay descent
Malaysian Muslims
People's Justice Party (Malaysia) politicians
Members of the Dewan Rakyat
Women members of the Dewan Rakyat
21st-century Malaysian politicians
21st-century Malaysian women politicians
1950 births